Breuil-Bois-Robert is a commune in the Yvelines department in the Île-de-France region in north-central France.

History
The commune of Breuil-Bois-Robert was created in 1868 from the merger of two former communes: Breuil and Bois-Robert-et-Labrosse.

See also
Communes of the Yvelines department

References

Communes of Yvelines